The 2015 Pan American Games Parade of Nations occurred at the 2015 Pan American Games opening ceremony, held beginning at 18:45 Eastern Daylight Time (UTC−4) on July 10, 2015. 41 athletes bearing the flags of their respective nations led their national delegations as they paraded into Pan Am Ceremonies Venue in the host city of Toronto, Ontario, Canada.

Athletes entered the stadium in an order dictated by tradition. As the host of the first Pan American Games, Argentina entered first. The Canadian delegation entered last, representing the host nation. The remaining countries entered in Spanish alphabetical order as per Pan American Sports Organization protocol.

As each nation entered the music reflected the traditional instruments and melodic styles of each of the 41 countries and territories. Silhouettes portraying the five disciplines of the pentathlon appear in the distance to honour their entrance (javelin, long jump, wrestling, discus and running), where the first multi sport games and the Pan American Games grew from their foundations. Each nation was preceded by a placard bearer holding a high-tech LED Device which flashed the name of each participating team in the three languages (English, French and Spanish), the former two also being the official languages of Canada.

List

References

National Flag Bearers, 2015 Pan American Games
Parades in Toronto